Unirule Institute of Economics was a Beijing-based Chinese think tank established in 1993.  Unirule conducted research and education in social sciences, primarily in economics, governance, policy, and culture. Unirule was dedicated to the open exchange of ideas in economics in general, with a particular focus on institutional economics. In the University of Pennsylvania’s 2012 Global Go To Think Tanks Report, Unirule ranked 14th in the category of “Best Think Tanks with an Annual Operating Budget under $5M USD”. In August 2019 the institute announced that it would be closing down due to governmental pressure.

Unirule aimed at promoting modern theoretical study of economics in China, providing  research products in economics and other social sciences, such as institutional solutions for governments, enterprises and other institutions, and pursuing the augmentation of social welfare as a whole.

Unirule fellows were non-residential research economists, jurists, sociologists, and humanists coming from various research institutes, such as Chinese Academy of Social Sciences, and Development Research Center of State Council, and Zhejiang University.

Political stance
Unirule was dedicated to promoting constitutional democracy and market economy in China.

History
Unirule Institute of Economics was an independent, non-for-profit, nongovernmental think tank, which was founded jointly in July 1993 by Sheng Hong (盛洪), Mao Yushi, Zhang Shuguang (张曙光), Fan Gang, Tang Shouning (唐寿宁), and Beijing Universal Culture Co. Ltd. (北京大象文化有限公司).

In late 1999, the Institute underwent its first organizational restructuring  and separated into two divisions. The consulting division was renamed as the Unirule Consulting Firm (UCF) and was fully commercialized from then on, while the organization's academic division remained as the Unirule Institute of Economics (Unirule), a private non-for-profit research institution. The two organizations now keep an "arm's length market relationship," that keeps separate all operations and financial relationships while under the direction of its respective board of directors.

Guangzhou Unirule Research Center was established in July, 2012 and located in the capital city Guangzhou. It is dedicated to contribute to the solutions of system innovation of Guangdong Province during the “open-up”process and promote the successful open-up experiences shaped in Guangzhou to other parts of China.

Unirule used to run a Chinese website which focused on wide range of hot topic issues in China and regularly posted Chinese essays. China-review.com was an academic exchange platform of Unirule to promote communication between intellectuals and the public. All of Unirule's websites, social media accounts, as well as the social media accounts of Unirule's leading researchers, were closed down by the City of Beijing's government in late January 2017.

On 10 July 2018, the institute was evicted without notice from their offices in Beijing. Workmen welded the door shut with five staff members inside, although they were released after police arrived.  The Aijiaying leasing company from whom the institute leased their offices claimed that the contract was terminated after complaints from other residents in the block, but the institute's director, Sheng Hong, stated that he thought their eviction was carried out on the orders of government authorities. Sheng added that they would try to hire temporary premises for meetings in the future, but in the modern age the institute could survive without a physical presence. As of 2019, the institute operates with a 10 person staff located about 15 miles north of central Beijing.

In August 2019, the institute announced that in response to governmental pressure it would be closing down permanently. The institute said that the Beijing municipal government had issued an order to shut down the institute as it was accused of violating regulations. The institute intends to file a legal challenge to the order, but it is not expected to be successful.

Publications
Unirule as an institution produced its Annual Report of the institution itself and publishes books and reports from the institution's own research. The books and reports included Chinese economy, such as “ China’s State-owned Enterprises: Nature, Performance, and Reform", China Economics(series, since 1994); Public governance, such as Report of Public Government Index of 30 Capital Cities(since 2008); Institutional economics, such as “Game: the Segmentation, Implementation and Protection of Land Rights”, “Case Studies in China’s Institutional Change”, “A Democratic and Legal System—The Reform of China’s Government System” and so on. In addition, articles, reports, policy briefs and opinion pieces were published on media, such a Xinhua News Agency, Economic Daily, China Daily, People’s Daily, The Economist, Reuters, the Financial Times and others. The Unirule ran a column on The Financial Times Chinese website.

Funders
Unirule did not receive financial assistance from any government entities, and instead, was dependent upon social donations and provisional grants for projects from institutions in China and abroad. Projects included research proposals entrusted to Unirule, training programs and other services provided.

Some projects were supported by Center for International Private Enterprises (CIPE), the Ford Foundation, Alton Jones Foundation, US-China Chamber of Commerce, and the International Institute of Economics (IIE).

References

External links

1993 establishments in China
2019 disestablishments in China
Organizations based in Beijing
Political and economic think tanks based in China
Think tanks established in 1993
Think tanks disestablished in 2019